Ingrīda Priede (born 8 May 1981) is a Latvian former Paralympic athlete who competed in international track and field competitions. She competed in discus throw and shot put, she is a World champion in shot put and a two-time European bronze medalist in discus. She competed at the 2004 and 2008 Summer Paralympics.

References

1981 births
Living people
Sportspeople from Jelgava
Paralympic athletes of Latvia
Latvian female discus throwers
Latvian shot putters
Athletes (track and field) at the 2004 Summer Paralympics
Athletes (track and field) at the 2008 Summer Paralympics
Medalists at the World Para Athletics Championships
World Para Athletics Championships winners
Medalists at the World Para Athletics European Championships